Ted Kimbro (September 8, 1895 – September 29, 1918) was an American Negro league infielder in the 1910s.

Early life and career
A native of St. Louis, Missouri, Kimbro made his Negro leagues debut in 1914 for the West Baden Sprudels. He went on to play for the Louisville White Sox, St. Louis Giants, and Lincoln Giants, and finished his career in 1918 with the Hilldale Club. Kimbro served in the US Army during World War I, and died in 1918 at age 23 at Camp Dix as a result of the flu pandemic.

References

Further reading
 Plaindealer staff (October 11, 1918). "Seen and Heard During the Week". The Topeka Plaindealer. p. 3
 Defender staff (August 9, 1919). "Hilldale Team Is Coming to Chicago". The Chicago Defender. p. 11

External links
  and Seamheads

1895 births
1918 deaths
Hilldale Club players
Lincoln Giants players
Louisville White Sox (1914-1915) players
St. Louis Giants players
West Baden Sprudels players
Baseball players from St. Louis
United States Army personnel of World War I
American military personnel killed in World War I
Deaths from the Spanish flu pandemic in New Jersey
20th-century African-American sportspeople
Baseball infielders
African Americans in World War I
African-American United States Army personnel